The Svenska Dagbladet Gold Medal (but usually simply called Bragdguldet, "The Feat Gold") is an annual award "for the most significant Swedish sports achievement of the year". It has been awarded by a jury led by the Swedish morning paper Svenska Dagbladet since 1925. According to its statutes the Medal may be awarded in November or December to either an individual sportsperson or a team. An individual can be awarded the Medal no more than twice, and to receive a second medal, that athlete must be "regarded a class of his own".

List of gold medalists

1920s
1925 - Sten Pettersson, athletics
1926 - Arne Borg, swimming, and Edvin Wide, athletics
1927 - Sven Salén, sailing
1928 - Per-Erik Hedlund, cross-country skiing
1929 - Gillis Grafström, figure skating, and Sven Utterström, cross-country skiing

1930s
1930 - Johan Richthoff, wrestling
1931 - Sven Rydell, football
1932 - Ivar Johansson, wrestling
1933 - Sven "Sleven" Säfwenberg, bandy
1934 - Harald Andersson, athlete
1935 - Hans Drakenberg, fencing
1936 - Erik August Larsson, cross-country skiing
1937 - Torsten Ullman, shooting
1938 - Björn Borg, swimming
1939 - Sven Selånger, ski jumping and Nordic combined

1940s
1940 - Henry Kälarne, athletics, and Håkan Lidman, athletics
1941 - Alfred Dahlqvist, cross-country skiing
1942 - Gunder Hägg, athletics
1943 - Arne Andersson, athletics
1944 - Nils 'Mora-Nisse' Karlsson, cross-country skiing
1945 - Claes Egnell, modern pentathlon
1946 - Arvid Andersson, weightlifting
1947 - Gösta Frändfors, wrestling
1948 - William Grut, modern pentathlon
1949 - Gert Fredriksson, canoeing

1950s
1950 - Lennart Bergelin, tennis
1951 - Rune Larsson, athletics
1952 - Valter Nyström, athletics
1953 - Bertil Antonsson, wrestling
1954 - Bengt Nilsson, athletics
1955 - Sigvard Ericsson, skating
1956 - Lars Hall, modern pentathlon, and Sixten Jernberg, cross-country skiing
1957 - Dan Waern, athletics
1958 - Richard Dahl, athletics
1959 - Agne Simonsson, football

1960s
1960 - Jane Cederqvist, swimming
1961 - Ove Fundin, speedway, and Sten Lundin, motocross
1962 - Assar Rönnlund, cross-country skiing
1963 - Jonny Nilsson, skating
1964 - Rolf Peterson, canoeing
1965 - Kjell Johansson, table tennis
1966 - Kurt Johansson, shooting
1967 - The Fåglum brothers (Erik Pettersson, Gösta Pettersson, Sture Pettersson and Tomas Pettersson), cycling
1968 - Toini Gustafsson-Rönnlund, cross-country skiing
1969 - Ove Kindvall, football

1970s
1970 - Gunnar Larsson, swimming
1971 - Stellan Bengtsson, table tennis
1972 - Ulrika Knape, diving
1973 - Rolf Edling, fencing
1974 - Björn Borg, tennis
1975 - Ingemar Stenmark, alpine skiing
1976 - Anders Gärderud, athletics, and Bernt Johansson, cycling
1977 - Frank Andersson, wrestling
1978 - Björn Borg, tennis, and Ingemar Stenmark, alpine skiing
1979 - Malmö FF, football

1980s
1980 - Thomas Wassberg, cross-country skiing (originally refused to accept the medal, but eventually accepted the medal in early December 2013)
1981 - Annichen Kringstad, orienteering
1982 - Mats Wilander, tennis
1983 - Håkan Carlquist, motocross
1984 - Gunde Svan, cross-country skiing
1985 - Patrik Sjöberg, athletics
1986 - Tomas Johansson, wrestling
1987 - Sweden men's national ice hockey team, ice hockey, and Marie-Helene Westin, cross-country skiing
1988 - Tomas Gustafson, speed skating
1989 - Sweden national table tennis team, table tennis (Jan-Ove Waldner, Mikael Appelgren, Jörgen Persson, Erik Lindh, Peter Karlsson)

1990s
1990 - Stefan Edberg, tennis
1991 - Pernilla Wiberg, alpine skiing
1992 - Jan-Ove Waldner, table tennis
1993 - Torgny Mogren, cross-country skiing
1994 - Sweden national football team, football
1995 - Annika Sörenstam, golf
1996 - Agneta Andersson and Susanne Gunnarsson, canoeing
1997 - Ludmila Engquist, athletics
1998 - Sweden men's national handball team, handball
1999 - Tony Rickardsson, speedway

2000s
2000 - Lars Frölander, swimming
2001 - Per Elofsson, cross-country skiing
2002 - Susanne Ljungskog, cycling
2003 - Carolina Klüft, athletics
2004 - Stefan Holm, athletics
2005 - Kajsa Bergqvist, athletics
2006 - Anja Pärson, alpine skiing
2007 - Anja Pärson, alpine skiing
2008 - Jonas Jacobsson, shooting
2009 - Helena Jonsson, biathlon

2010s
2010 - Swedish men's Olympic 4 × 10 km relay team (Daniel Rickardsson, Johan Olsson, Anders Södergren, Marcus Hellner), cross-country skiing
2011 - Therese Alshammar, swimming
2012 - Lisa Nordén, triathlon
2013 - Johan Olsson, cross-country skiing
2014 - Swedish women's Olympic 4 × 5 km relay team (Ida Ingemarsdotter, Emma Wikén, Anna Haag, Charlotte Kalla), cross-country skiing
2015 - Sarah Sjöström, swimming
2016 - Henrik Stenson, golf
2017 - Sarah Sjöström, swimming
2018 - Hanna Öberg, biathlon
2019 - Tove Alexandersson, orienteering

2020s
2020 - Armand Duplantis, pole vault
2021 - Team Sweden (Malin Baryard-Johnsson, Henrik von Eckermann, and Peder Fredricson), show jumping
2022 - Nils van der Poel, speed skating

See also 
Jerring Award, established by the sport section of Sveriges Radio where the radio audience votes on the Swedish athlete or team that has made the best sport performance of the year

References

External links
Statutes

National sportsperson-of-the-year trophies and awards
Awards established in 1925
1925 establishments in Sweden
Swedish sports trophies and awards